Mirza Ahmed Ispahani High School is a school in Pahartali Thana, Chittagong, Bangladesh, for nursery through class X.

History
The school was founded on 12 March 1987 by Mirza Mehdy Ispahani, then chairman of M. M. Ispahani Limited.

Extracurricular activities
Every year MAIHS arranges sports week and prize giving ceremony and cultural function in the month of February in its playground.

References

External links
 Homepage

Schools in Chittagong
1987 establishments in Bangladesh